Dermatocarpon atrogranulosum, commonly known as the charred stippleback, is a species of saxicolous (rock-dwelling) lichen in the family Verrucariaceae. It is found in a few locations in British Columbia, Canada, where it grows on limestone outcrops. It was formally described as a new species in 2003 by Austrian lichenologist Othmar Breuss. It is one of 24 Dermatocarpon species known to occur in northern North America.

References

Verrucariales
Lichen species
Lichens described in 2003
Lichens of Western Canada